Edward Richard Callister Jr. (September 30, 1916 – October 28, 1980) was an American lawyer and politician who served as the Attorney General of Utah from 1953 to 1959, and was an Associate Justice of the Supreme Court of Utah from 1959 to 1975, serving as Chief Justice of the Supreme Court of Utah from 1971 to 1975.

His grandfather was Edward H. Callister, a newspaper man who was manager of The Salt Lake Herald-Republican Publishing Company, whose own parents emigrated from the Isle of Man in the 19th century.

References

1916 births
1980 deaths
People from Salt Lake City
Utah Attorneys General
Justices of the Utah Supreme Court
Utah Republicans
Chief Justices of the Utah Supreme Court
20th-century American judges